SCPB may refer to:

C5a peptidase, an enzyme
the ICAO code for Puelo Bajo Airport

See also
 SCP (disambiguation)
 SCPA (disambiguation)